Daniel "Dan" James Mavraides (Greek: Nτάνιελ "Nταν" Τζέιμς Μαυραειδής; born December 1, 1988) is a Greek American professional basketball player. At a height of 6 ft 4 in (1.93 m) tall, he played as a point guard-shooting guard. Following his graduation from college, he played professionally in Italy and Greece for two seasons.  Mavraides currently competes with the top-U.S. ranked Princeton 3x3 on the FIBA 3x3 World Tour.

High school
Mavraides played high school basketball at Junípero Serra High School and Phillips Exeter Academy.

College career
Mavraides played college basketball at Princeton University, with the Princeton Tigers, from 2007–2011. In the course of four seasons, Mavraides started 82 of his 97 games with Princeton averaging 10.9 points, 3.8 rebounds, and 1.5 assists per game.

Professional career
Mavraides began his professional basketball career after signing a 3-year contract with the Greek Basket League club Aris Thessaloniki in 2011. In 2012, he signed with the Italian League club Avellino. On December 7, 2012, he signed with the Italian League club Juvecaserta Basket. The 2012–13 season was the last of his professional basketball playing career.

Personal
Mavraides was born on December 1, 1988, in Boston, to John Mavraides and Dorothy Gallagher. He is of Greek American heritage.

References

External links
FIBA 3X3WT Profile
EuroCup Profile
FIBA Game Center Profile
Draftexpress.com Profile
Eurobasket.com Profile
Greek Basket League Profile 
Greek Basket League Profile 
Italian League Profile 
Princeton Tigers College Profile

1988 births
Living people
American expatriate basketball people in Greece
American expatriate basketball people in Italy
American people of Greek descent
Aris B.C. players
Basketball players from Boston
Juvecaserta Basket players
Greek men's basketball players
Greek Basket League players
Point guards
Princeton Tigers men's basketball players
Shooting guards
S.S. Felice Scandone players
American men's basketball players